The Bubble Nebula in Barnard's Galaxy has the official designation of Hubble 1925 I as it was the first (Roman numeral 1) object recorded in a paper by . It includes areas of bright H II emission.  It is located north-west of the larger Hubble 1925 III.

See also
 Ring Nebula (NGC 6822)

Notes

References

External links

H II regions
Sagittarius (constellation)
NGC 6822